Medical Education is a health professional education journal published by John Wiley & Sons and co-owned by Wiley and the Association for the Study of Medical Education. It is the senior international scientific journal for undergraduate, postgraduate and continuing medical education. As such, all issues of current interest, including teaching methods, curriculum reform, the training of medical teachers, the selection of entrants and assessment techniques, are covered. It is the main forum for teachers of medicine worldwide. The readership consists primarily of teachers of medicine, medical educators, administrators of faculties or medicine workers and researchers involved in the development of medical education as a whole.

History 
Originally published in 1966 as the British Journal of Medical Education, Medical Education released its 50th volume in 2016.  It has had 5 Editors-in-Chief: Sir John Ellis (1966-1976), Sir Henry Walton (1976-1996), Dr. Graham Buckley (1996-1998), Dr. John Bligh (1998-2005), Dr. John McLachlan (2006-2007), and Dr. Kevin Eva (2008-Present).

Abstracting and indexing 
The journal is abstracted and indexed in:

 Index Medicus/MEDLINE/PubMed
 Science Citation Index

Editorial board 
Editor in Chief

 Kevin W. Eva, Vancouver

Senior Deputy Editor

 John Norcini, Philadelphia

Deputy Editors

 Rola Ajjawi, Melbourne
 Jack Boulet, Philadelphia
 Jennifer Cleland, Singapore
 David Cook, Rochester, MN
 Paul Crampton, York 
 Shiphra Ginsburg, Toronto
 Karen Hauer, San Francisco
 Karen Mattick, Exeter
 Lynn Monrouxe, Sydney
 Martin Pusic, Boston
 Susan van Schalkwyk, Cape Town
 Pim Teunissen, Maastricht
 Tim Wilkinson, Christchurch

Associate Editor, Really Good Stuff

 M Brownell Anderson, Philadelphia

Associate Editor, When I say...

 Kieran Walsh, London

Associate Editor, Social Media

 Simon Fleming, London

Consulting Editor

 Lambert Schuwirth, Adelaide

Quality and Standards Advisory Group

 Chair: Wendy Rogers, Sydney
 David Brewster, Timor-Leste
 John Goldie, Glasgow
 Olle Th. J. ten Cate, Utrecht

Equity, Diversity, and Inclusion Lead
 Rola Ajjawi, Melbourne

International Editorial Board

 Chair: Ara Tekian, Chicago
 Former Chair: Karen Mann, Halifax
 Angel Centeno, Buenos Aires
 Mora Claramita, Yogyakarta
 Diana Dolmans, Maastricht
 Elizabeth Farmer, Wollongong
 Martin Fischer, Munich
 Dawit Wondimagegn Gebreamlak, Addis Ababa
 David Gordon, Ferney-Voltaire
 Ming-Jung Ho, Taipei
 Jan Illing, Newcastle upon Tyne
 Debra Klamen, Illinois
 Lorelei Lingard, London, CA
 Mathieu Nendaz, Geneva
 Junji Otaki, Tokyo
 Avinash Supe, Mumbai
 Christine Nu Viet Vu, Geneva
 Weimin Wang, Beijing
 Liz Wolvaardt, Cape Town
 Paul Worley, Adelaide
 Rukhsana Zuberi, Karachi

Editorial Interns

 Roghayeh Gandomkar, Tehran University, Iran
 Honghe Li, China Medical University, China
 Anél Weise, University College Cork, Ireland

Sub-Social Media Editors, Visual Abstracts

 Aqua Asif, Leicester
 Oliver Burton, Newcastle upon Tyne

Publisher's Office

 Sheryl Acorda, Production Editor

Past Editors-in-Chief

 Sir John Ellis, UK, 1966-1975
 Sir Henry Walton, UK, 1976-1997
 Graham Buckley, UK, 1996-1998
 John Bligh, UK, 1999-2005
 John McLachlan, UK, 2006-2007

Official website 
www.mededuc.com

References 

Education journals
General medical journals